William John Gliddon (31 August 1896 – 28 January 1974) was an Australian rules footballer who played with Geelong in the Victorian Football League (VFL).

Notes

External links 

1896 births
1974 deaths
Australian rules footballers from Victoria (Australia)
Geelong Football Club players
East Geelong Football Club players